Miguel Merz (born 9 June 1967) is a Salvadoran former professional tennis player.

Biography
Born in Switzerland to German parents, Merz was an immigrant to El Salvador and represented his adoptive country in a total of 31 Davis Cup ties. He won 38 matches in his Davis Cup career, 23 in singles and 15 in doubles.

Merz, a right-handed player, competed on the professional tour during the 1990s. He reached a career best singles ranking of 254 in the world, which was highest attained by a Salvadoran until beaten by Marcelo Arévalo. His best ATP Tour performance was a second round appearance at the 1991 Geneva Open and he featured in the qualifying draw for the 1992 Wimbledon Championships.

References

External links
 
 
 

1967 births
Living people
Salvadoran male tennis players
Salvadoran people of German descent
Salvadoran people of Swiss descent
Sportspeople from Basel-Stadt
Central American and Caribbean Games bronze medalists for El Salvador
Central American and Caribbean Games medalists in tennis